The launeddas (also called Sardinian triple clarinet) are a traditional Sardinian woodwind instrument made of three pipes, each of which has an idioglot single reed. They are a polyphonic instrument, with one of the pipes functioning as a drone and the other two playing the melody in thirds and sixths.

Predecessors of the launeddas are found throughout Northern Africa and the Middle East. In 2700 BCE, the Egyptian reed pipes were originally called "memet"; during the Old Kingdom of Egypt (2778–2723 BCE), memets were depicted on the reliefs of seven tombs at Saqqara, six tombs at Giza, and the pyramids of Queen Khentkaus.

The Sardinian launeddas themselves are an ancient instrument, being traced back to at least the eighth century BCE, as is testified during the Nuragic civilization by an ithyphallic bronze statuette found in Ittiri. The launeddas are still played today during religious ceremonies and dances (su ballu in Sardinian language). Distinctively, they are played using extensive variations on a few melodic phrases, and a single piece can last over an hour, producing some of the "most elemental and resonant (sounds) in European music".

Description

Launeddas are used to play a complex style of music by circular breathing that has achieved some international attention, especially Efisio Melis,  Antonio Lara, Dionigi Burranca and Luigi Lai. Melis and Lara were the biggest stars of the 1930s golden age of launeddas, and each taught their style to apprentices like Lara's Aureliu Porcu.

Launeddas consist of three reed pipes, two five-holed chanters of different lengths and one drone. They are played using circular breathing.

Since the late 20th century the launeddas have also been used in non-traditional contexts. In 1990, the American jazz saxophonist Dave Liebman released a CD called The Blessing of the Old. Long Sound, where he collaborates with the launeddas players Alberto Mariani, Carlo Mariani, and Dionigi Burranca. The CD was recorded in Milan in November 1989. In 1996, the British free jazz saxophonist Evan Parker released a double-CD collaboration with Carlo Mariani and other world musicians entitled Synergetics—Phonomanie III, which was recorded in Ulrichsberg, Austria in September 1993.

See also
 Triple pipes

References

Further reading
F. W. Bentzon, The Launeddas. A Sardinian folk music instrument (2 voll. Acta Musicologica Danica n°1), Akademisk Forlag, Copenhagen, 1969.
P. Mercurio, La Cultura delle Launeddas. Cabras. I Suoni del Maestro Giovanni Casu, Solinas, Nuoro, 2011.
F. W. Bentzon, Launeddas, Cagliari, 2002 .
F. W. Bentzon, Launeddas, et sardisk folkemusikinstrument, Dansk Musik-tidsskrift, Copenhagen, May, 1961, No. 3, pp. 97–105.
Bernard Lortat-Jacob (1982). "Theory and 'Bricolage': Attilio Cannargiu's Temperament", Yearbook for Traditional Music, Vol. 14, pp. 45–54.
P. Mercurio, Launeddas Patrimonio dell'Umanità. Strumento dell'Identità Musicale Sarda, collana “Ethnomusica & Istruzione”, Milano, 2015  
Efisio Melis and Antonio Lara – Launeddas (2001), cited in Robert Andrews (2007). The Rough Guide to Sardinia, p. 335. 3rd edition. .

Listening
Launeddas player Luigi Lai

External links
Sonus de Canna, information on history, characteristics, construction details, partially in Italian
Triplepipe.net, information on history, pictures, and MP3 samples
All about launeddas and sardinian music

Sardinian musical instruments
Single-reed instruments
Early musical instruments
Italian musical instruments